The following lists events that happened in 1941 in Iceland.

Incumbents
Monarch - Kristján X
Prime Minister – Hermann Jónasson

Events

Births

2 January – Björgólfur Guðmundsson, businessman
6 January – Ingvar Elísson, footballer
17 April – Jón Sigurðsson, politician.

Full date missing
Hafliði Hallgrímsson, composer

Deaths

30 October – Ingibjörg H. Bjarnason, politician, suffragist, schoolteacher and gymnast (b. 1867)

References

 
1940s in Iceland
Iceland
Iceland
Years of the 20th century in Iceland